Aquaman and the Lost Kingdom is an upcoming American superhero film based on the DC Comics character Aquaman. Produced by DC Studios, the Safran Company, and Atomic Monster Productions, and set for distribution by Warner Bros. Pictures, it is intended to be the sequel to Aquaman (2018), and the 15th and final installment in the DC Extended Universe (DCEU). The film is directed by James Wan from a screenplay written by David Leslie Johnson-McGoldrick, and stars Jason Momoa as Arthur Curry / Aquaman alongside Amber Heard, Willem Dafoe, Patrick Wilson, Dolph Lundgren, Yahya Abdul-Mateen II, Temuera Morrison, and Nicole Kidman.

Momoa pitched a story for an Aquaman sequel during production of the first film. Wan did not want to rush a sequel but agreed in January 2019 to oversee development. Johnson-McGoldrick signed to write the screenplay a month later, and Wan was confirmed to be directing in August 2020. He said the film would expand on Aquaman worldbuilding, and announced the sequel's title in June 2021. Filming began at the end of the month and concluded in January 2022, taking place in the United Kingdom, Hawaii, Los Angeles, and New Jersey.

Aquaman and the Lost Kingdom is scheduled to be released on December 25, 2023, following several delays due to the COVID-19 pandemic, and post-production and financial setbacks.

Premise 

When an ancient power is unleashed, Aquaman must forge an uneasy alliance with an unlikely ally to protect Atlantis, and the world, from irreversible devastation.

Cast 
 Jason Momoa as Arthur Curry / Aquaman: The half-Atlantean/half-human king of Atlantis who can swim at supersonic speeds and communicate with aquatic life.
 Amber Heard as Mera: The princess of Xebel and daughter of King Nereus who can control water with her mind and communicate with other Atlanteans telepathically.
 Willem Dafoe as Nuidis Vulko: The vizier of Atlantis and Arthur's mentor.
 Patrick Wilson as Orm Marius: Arthur's Atlantean half-brother and the former king of Atlantis who is imprisoned following his crimes against Atlantis.
 Dolph Lundgren as King Nereus: The king of Xebel and Mera's father.
 Yahya Abdul-Mateen II as David Kane / Black Manta: A ruthless pirate and high-seas mercenary who uses an Atlantean armored suit, seeking to kill Aquaman as revenge for the death of his father.
 Temuera Morrison as Tom Curry: Arthur's father, a lighthouse keeper.
 Nicole Kidman as Atlanna: Arthur's mother and the former queen of Atlantis.

Additionally, Ben Affleck is expected to reprise his role as Bruce Wayne / Batman, the CEO of Wayne Enterprises and vigilante superhero who previously teamed up with Arthur to defeat Steppenwolf. Also appearing are Randall Park as Dr. Stephen Shin, a marine biologist obsessed with finding Atlantis; Vincent Regan as Atlan, the first king of Atlantis; Jani Zhao as Stingray; Indya Moore as Karshon; and Pilou Asbæk in an undisclosed role.

Production

Development 
During the production of Aquaman (2018), star Jason Momoa developed a story pitch for a sequel that he gave to Warner Bros. Pictures Group chairman Toby Emmerich and producer Peter Safran. In October 2018, before the film's release, Momoa said he would be more involved in the development of a potential sequel and expected filming to begin in 2019. Director James Wan said there were several storylines that could spin out from Aquaman, with that film introducing seven underwater kingdoms that had yet to be fully explored. Emmerich had enough confidence in box office projections for the film by early December to begin discussing a sequel. By the end of January, when Aquaman was set to become the highest-grossing film based on a single DC Comics character, Warner Bros. was in negotiations with Wan to oversee the development and writing of a sequel with the potential to return as director. Geoff Boucher of Deadline Hollywood noted that Wan had been very protective of sequels to his previous films Insidious (2010) and The Conjuring (2013), and was "deeply invested" in the worldbuilding of Aquaman. Wan had previously compared the world of Aquaman to other fictional worlds such as Middle-earth, the Star Wars galaxy, and the Wizarding World.

In early February 2019, Warner Bros. hired Noah Gardner and Aidan Fitzgerald to write the script for an Aquaman spin-off film titled The Trench, based on one of the kingdoms introduced in the first film. It was expected to have a smaller budget and not feature the main cast of Aquaman, with Wan and Safran producing. Borys Kit of The Hollywood Reporter reported then that there had not yet been serious discussions about a direct sequel to Aquaman between the studio, Wan, and Momoa, due to them wanting to have a "breather" first, but several days later he reported that active development on a sequel was getting underway with the first film's co-writer, and frequent Wan collaborator, David Leslie Johnson-McGoldrick signing on to write the screenplay. Wan and Safran were producing the sequel, though it was still unclear if Wan would direct it. At the end of February, Warner Bros. scheduled Aquaman 2 for release on December 16, 2022. The next month, Safran explained that he and Wan did not want to rush a sequel, and Warner Bros. had been supportive of that which is why the film's release was scheduled for four years after the first film. He added that they were approaching the Aquaman franchise in a similar way to the Conjuring Universe, with spin-offs like The Trench exploring stories about the underwater kingdoms alongside the "mothership" films starring Aquaman. Safran said Wan knew "the architecture, the armory, the military, the look, the feel, the general vibe" of each of the seven kingdoms and wanted to explore them all in future projects.

In July 2019, Wan was set to direct the film Malignant (2021) before beginning work on Aquaman 2. Patrick Wilson said in November that he had discussed plans for the sequel with Wan and indicated that he would be reprising his role as Orm Marius / Ocean Master from the first film. A month later, Yahya Abdul-Mateen II confirmed that he was returning as David Kane / Black Manta, and was looking to flesh out the character. Johnson-McGoldrick stated in March 2020 that the sequel would not be based on a specific comic book, but was taking inspiration from the Aquaman stories of the Silver Age of Comic Books that featured Black Manta as the villain. Wan was confirmed to be directing the sequel at the virtual DC FanDome event in August, when he said it would be more serious than the first film and feature themes that were more relevant to the real world. He added that it would include more worldbuilding and exploration of the underwater kingdoms, and would feature some horror elements similar to the Trench sequence in the first film. Being able to expand on the worldbuilding of the first film was one of the key reasons that Wan chose to direct the sequel, along with Johnson-McGoldrick's script which Wan felt had a "really cool story to bring all these characters back, and then growing them in a big way".

Amber Heard debunked rumors in November that she would not be reprising her role as Mera from the first film following allegations of domestic abuse made against her by her ex-husband Johnny Depp. That month, a petition to have Heard fired from the franchise received more than 1.5 million signatures, and came after Warner Bros. removed Depp from Fantastic Beasts: The Secrets of Dumbledore (2022) when allegations made by The Sun that Depp abused Heard were ruled to be "substantially true" in a defamation lawsuit filed by Depp against The Sun. Safran said they never considered making the film without Heard and would not react to the "pure fan pressure" of the petition and other social media conversations. However, Heard later stated (during a defamation trial brought against her by Depp over a column in The Washington Post) that "they didn't want to include" her in the film and she had to fight to keep her part, claiming that revisions were made to the script that reduced her role to a "very pared down version", including removing action sequences for her character, and she was unable to renegotiate her contract (Heard's original contract stipulated that she earn $2 million for the sequel, double what she made for the first film). By that point, in May 2022, the petition to have Heard removed from the film had received more than 4 million signatures. DC Films head Walter Hamada said they did consider recasting Mera, but this was due to concerns over Heard's chemistry with Momoa rather than the abuse allegations. He added that it was the studio's policy not to renegotiate contracts for all actors, and said the size of Heard's role had not changed during development of the sequel. He explained that the film was always intended to be a "buddy comedy" that focused on the relationship between Aquaman and Orm. The defamation trial's jury found that Heard's Washington Post column had damaged Depp's career and she was ordered to pay him compensation. Social media responses to the trial also heavily favored Depp over Heard, with "countless memes and TikToks mocking her testimony". In June 2022, reports emerged that Heard had been fired from the film following the trial, but these were also debunked.

Pre-production 
Dolph Lundgren said in February 2021 that he was reprising his role as King Nereus in the sequel, with filming expected to begin later that year in London. A month later, the planned start date for filming was revealed to be in June, though there was potential for this to be impacted by the COVID-19 pandemic. In April, Warner Bros. and DC announced that development on The Trench was no longer moving forward, with the studios not having room for the spin-off on their slate of films and believing Aquaman 2 to be enough of an expansion of the franchise for the time being. Later that month, Pilou Asbæk entered talks to join the film's cast. Momoa said in May that he would begin filming in July, and Wan announced a month later that the sequel was titled Aquaman and the Lost Kingdom, with Temuera Morrison confirming his return as Aquaman's father Thomas Curry. Willem Dafoe was also set to reprise his role as Nuidis Vulko from the first film.

Filming 
Principal photography began in London on June 28, 2021, under the working title Necrus. Don Burgess returned as cinematographer from the first film. In August, Wan said the sequel was strongly influenced by the film Planet of the Vampires (1965). Filming took place at Saunton Sands beach, Devon, in early September. Later that month, Asbæk's casting was confirmed; Randall Park was revealed to be returning from the first film as Dr. Stephen Shin; Vincent Regan had been cast as the ancient king Atlan, replacing Graham McTavish who briefly portrayed the character in the first film; Jani Zhao was set to portray Stingray, an original character for the film, in her first English-language feature role; and Indya Moore was revealed to be portraying Karshon in the sequel. After shooting 95 percent of the film in the United Kingdom, production moved to Hawaii until December 9, for on-location shooting. Filming also occurred in Jersey City, New Jersey that year. Nicole Kidman was confirmed to have reprised her role as Aquaman's mother Atlanna shortly after that. Filming then moved to Los Angeles, and officially wrapped on January 12, 2022, in Malibu.

Post-production 
In March 2022, Warner Bros. adjusted its release schedule due to the impacts of COVID-19 on the workload of visual effects vendors. Aquaman and the Lost Kingdom was moved to March 17, 2023, and The Flash was also moved from 2022 to 2023, to allow time for their visual effects work to be completed, while Shazam! Fury of the Gods was moved up to this film's previous release date because it would be ready for release earlier. In June 2022, the final writing credits were revealed: Johnson-McGoldrick received screenplay credit, while the duos of Wan and Johnson-McGoldrick, and Momoa and Thomas Pa'a Sibbett received story credit. 

The next month, Momoa revealed that Ben Affleck was reprising his DC Extended Universe (DCEU) role of Bruce Wayne / Batman for reshoots on the Warner Bros. backlot in Burbank, California. Aaron Couch of The Hollywood Reporter reported soon after that Michael Keaton had filmed a scene as his version of Bruce Wayne / Batman from Tim Burton's Batman (1989) and Batman Returns (1992). Keaton's version was set to be introduced to the DCEU in The Flash before that film's release was pushed to after Aquaman and the Lost Kingdom. The scene reportedly confused audiences during test screenings, and Couch felt this was why Affleck joined the reshoots. 

In August, after WarnerMedia merged with Discovery, Inc. to form Warner Bros. Discovery, the studio delayed the film to December 25, 2023, to help spread out the marketing and distribution costs for its feature films. This pushed the film's release to after the planned release of The Flash, which meant there was potential for Keaton's version of Batman to appear in the film instead of Affleck's. In October, The Hollywood Reporter reported that Keaton's cameo had potentially been cut.

Music 
Rupert Gregson-Williams revealed in August 2021 that he was returning to compose the score for the sequel after doing so for the first film.

Marketing 
Wan and Wilson teased plans for the film in a panel at the virtual DC FanDome event in August 2020. A year later, at DC FanDome 2021, concept art and behind-the-scenes footage from filming was revealed. In February 2022, the first footage from the film was released as part of a teaser for Warner Bros.' 2022 slate of DC films, which also included The Batman, Black Adam, and The Flash (before Aquaman and the Lost Kingdom and The Flash were delayed to 2023 in the following month). Wan promoted the film at Warner Bros.' CinemaCon panel in April 2022, showing a recorded message of Momoa as well as some brief footage from the film. He then revealed more concept art for the film when its release date was delayed in August.

Release 
Aquaman and the Lost Kingdom is scheduled to be released in the United States on December 25, 2023. It was originally set for release on December 16, 2022, but was moved from there to March 17, 2023, when Warner Bros. adjusted its release schedule due to the impact of the pandemic on the workload of visual effects vendors. It was then moved to the December 2023 date when Warner Bros. Discovery was trying to spread out marketing and distribution costs.

Future 
In December 2022, The Hollywood Reporter reported that Warner Bros. was considering ending the Aquaman film series and then recasting Momoa in another DCEU role. In January 2023, Momoa stated that he will "always be Aquaman", but that "there might be some other characters" as well. The following month, DC Studios co-CEO James Gunn publicly unveiled an early slate of projects for the planned DC Universe (DCU) media franchise and shared universe intended to succeed the DCEU. Alongside the announcement, Gunn stated that as the final two films in the DCEU, The Lost Kingdom, alongside The Flash (2023), would lead into the rebooted film lineup beginning with Superman: Legacy (2025), the first film of the new DCU. Gunn and co-CEO Peter Safran also addressed speculation that Momoa would be playing multiple DC characters in the future alongside Aquaman, stating that the pair have to decide the character and actor's status following the film's release. Both subsequently confirmed that Momoa would not play both characters in a dual role in the franchise.

References

External links 
 

2020s American films
2020s English-language films
2020s superhero films
2023 action films
2023 fantasy films
American action films
American sequel films
American superhero films
Aquaman (film series)
Aquaman films
DC Extended Universe films
Films about mermaids
Films about royalty
Films directed by James Wan
Films impacted by the COVID-19 pandemic
Films scored by Rupert Gregson-Williams
Films set in Atlantis
Films set on oceans
Films shot in Hawaii
Films shot in London
Films shot in Los Angeles
Films shot in New Jersey
Superhero crossover films
Underwater civilizations in fiction
Upcoming sequel films
Warner Bros. films